Jafar Abdollahi-Sharif (born 1963, in Urmia, West Azerbaijan) is the President of Urmia University of Technology since June, 2015. also Abdollahi-Sharif is a faculty member of the college engineering in Urmia University.

References

See also
 Jafar Abdollahi-Sharif at Urmia University of Technology

1963 births
Living people
Academic staff of Urmia University
University of Tehran alumni
People from Urmia
Moscow State University alumni
Mining engineers